Hymns to the Rising Sun is a best-of compilation album by the Swedish melodic death metal band Amon Amarth. It was released through Metal Blade Records on 8 September 2010.

Track listing

2010 greatest hits albums
Amon Amarth albums